Altri SGPS SA is a Portuguese industrial conglomerate headquartered in Porto. The group's main companies operate in wood pulp production, cultivation of forests for the timber and paper industry and co-generation of energy, including energy production from renewable resources. Prior to 2008 the group also operated in the steelworks industry.

Altri's holding company is Altri SGPS, SA., which is listed on the Euronext Lisbon stock exchange. Its major subsidiaries are Celulose do Caima (paper industry) and Celbi (paper industry). Altri's F. Ramada subsidiary, which produced steel and storage systems such as cold rolled steel sheets and strips, machinery, tools and other related products, was spun off on the stock exchange in 2008. Altri was itself born from a spin-out of the industrial assets of the Cofina group in March 2005.

References

External links

Conglomerate companies of Portugal
Companies based in Porto
Conglomerate companies established in 2005
Pulp and paper companies of Portugal